Sunaula Bazar is a town in  Nilkantha Municipality in Dhading District in the Bagmati Zone of central Nepal. The formerly Village development committee was merged to form municipality on 18 May 2014 merging along with Nilkantha, Sunaula Bazar, Murali Bhanjyang, Sangkosh Village development committees. At the time of the 1991 Nepal census it had a population of 6480 and had 1233 houses in it. Formerly it was the headquarter of Dhading District.

Education:  Altogether it has two higher secondary schools. Bhairabi Higher Secondary School is the first Secondary school in Dhading District. Yearly about 500 students take part in SLC in this VDC. Bhuwan Adhikari is the all-time top scorer in SLC from Sunaula Bazar with 91.125%.

References

Populated places in Dhading District